Ballerus is a genus of cyprinid fish containing two Eurasian species.

Species
 Ballerus ballerus (Linnaeus, 1758) (Zope)
 Ballerus sapa (Pallas, 1814) (White-eye bream)

References

 

 
Cyprinidae genera